Platyseius is a genus of mites in the family Ascidae.

Species
 Platyseius capillatus Berlese, 1916      
 Platyseius cupensis Halliday, Walter & Lindquist, 1998      
 Platyseius flagellatus Karg, 1994      
 Platyseius horridus (Evans & Hyatt, 1960)      
 Platyseius leleupi van-Driel, Loots & Marais, 1977      
 Platyseius subglaber (Oudemans, 1903)

References

Ascidae